Bitmap textures are digital images representing a surface, a material, a pattern or even a picture, generated by an artist or designer using a bitmap editor software such as Adobe Photoshop or Gimp or simply by scanning an image and, if necessary, retouching it on a personal computer.

Textures can be built as a large image, larger than the final destination (such a page, for example) so as to fill the complete area without repeating the image (thus avoiding visible seams). Also bitmap textures can be created to be used as repetitive patterns to fill an infinite area. The borders of these patterns or small textures should be treated to give a seamless appearance when applied to an image, unless, of course, the seam is something to be shown.

When designed for print, textures should be created in high-resolution in order to achieve good results in the final print.

On the other side, if these textures are meant to be used in multimedia, 3d animation or web design, they should be created in a maximum resolution that equals the one of the final display (TV, computer monitor, movie projector, etc.).

If creating a texture with a computer is not an option, then textures can be obtained by purchasing stock images collections, which are expensive but often of a professional quality.

This article was taken from The Photoshop Roadmap with written permission.

See also
 Procedural textures

External links
 Photoshop textures and backgrounds tutorials
 Photoshop CS Tutorial listings, textures, layouts, and more..
 High Resolution Photoshop textures and backgrounds

Computer graphics